Holy fuck is an interjection.

Holy fuck may also refer to:

Holy Fuck, an improvisational electronica band from Toronto, Canada
Holy Fuck (album), the band's debut album (2005)
Holy Fuck (EP), the band's self-titled EP (2007)
Holy Fvck, an album by Demi Lovato